is a popular Japanese food, a bowl of rice topped with a deep-fried breaded pork cutlet, 
egg, vegetables, and condiments.

The dish takes its name from the Japanese words tonkatsu (for pork cutlet) and donburi (for rice bowl dish).

It has become a modern tradition for Japanese students to eat katsudon the night before taking a major test or school entrance exam. This is because "katsu" is a homophone of the verb , meaning "to win" or "to be victorious". It is also a trope in Japanese police films: that suspects will speak the truth with tears when they have eaten katsudon and are asked, "Did you ever think about how your mother feels about this?" Even nowadays, the gag of "We must eat katsudon while interrogating" is popular in Japanese films. However, police will never actually feed suspects during interrogation.

Preparation
The tonkatsu for the katsudon dish is prepared by dipping the cutlet in flour, followed by egg, then dipping in panko breadcrumbs, and deep-frying. Next, into a boiling broth of dashi, soy sauce and onions, the sliced tonkatsu and a beaten egg is cooked.

Variants
Other bowls, made of cutlet and rice but without eggs or stock, may also be called katsudon. Such dishes include:
 sōsu katsudon (sauce katsudon): with tonkatsu sauce or Worcestershire sauce, from regions such as Fukui, Kōfu, Gunma, Aizuwakamatsu and Komagane
 demi katsudon or domi katsudon: with demi-glace and often green peas, a specialty of Okayama
 shōyu-dare katsudon: with soy sauce based tare sauce, Niigata style
 misokatsu-don:  tonkatsu with a sauce made with hatchō miso on rice, a favorite in Nagoya

If pork is substituted with beef, it will be gyū-katsu-don. A variation made with chicken katsu and egg is called oyako katsudon, which is distinguished from oyakodon where the meat in the latter is not fried.

In popular culture
In Doraemon: Nobita and the Birth of Japan 2016, Takeshi Gouda had Katsudon for lunch when they time travelled to the Stone Age period.
In Isekai Shokudo light novel series, Katsudon is the favourite food of Lionel, a beastman who managed to become a gladiator champion from weekly eating Katsudon.
In Tsuihousha Shokudou e Youkoso!, Dennis made Katsudon for Henrietta, a penniless female knight who was ousted from her adventurer party and also Esther Kingland a princess which both deeply enjoyed.

See also

Donburi: Japanese bowls of food on rice
Gyūdon: with simmered beef
Oyakodon: with chicken and egg
Unadon: with eel
Tonkatsu: deep fried pork cutlet
Katsukarē: another tonkatsu dish with curry sauce and without eggs, served in a plate with spoon, not in a bowl with chopsticks.

References

External links

Donburi
Japanese meat dishes
Japanese rice dishes